The Philippines participated at the 14th Southeast Asian Games held in Jakarta, Indonesia.

SEA Games Performance
Out of 376 Gold medals at stake, the Philippine contingent won 59 or 15.69%. The medal tallies indicate a continuing decline in the performance of Filipino athletes in the Southeast Asian Games, the same trend is noted in the Silver and Bronze medal categories. Philippine Olympic Committee (POC) President Jose Sering was so far happy that the athletes did better and Gintong Alay Director Jose Romasanta said it was good enough.

Medalists

Gold

Silver

Bronze

Multiple

Medal summary

By sports

References

External links
http://www.olympic.ph

Southeast Asian Games
Nations at the 1987 Southeast Asian Games
1987